The Camaldolese Dictionary is a Latin-Slovak dictionary from 1763. The book consists of two parts: the  dictionary and brief orthographic and grammatical rules.  The author(s) used a variant of a cultural Western-Slovak with some Central and Eastern-Slovak elements, making it one of most important pre-codification works before the codification of Slovak language by Anton Bernolák. The origin of the dictionary is probably associated with the first known translation of the Bible into Slovak (the Camaldolese Bible).

References

Language
Slovak
Slovak language
Slovak literature